At the end of 2015, the installed capacity of wind power in Washington was 3,075 megawatts (MW) with wind power accounting for 7,101 GWh. In 2016, it reached a generation of 8,041 GWh, comprising 7.1% of the electricity generated in the state. In 2019, it had a capacity of 3,085 MW, responsible for 7.33% of generation.

State legislative support

Initiative 937 requires electric utilities with 25,000 or more customers to have 15 percent of their power supply generated from new renewable resources – excluding existing hydropower – by 2020. Washington has sales tax exemptions for wind energy. Washington provides utility grants, loans and rebates for wind power.

Notable projects

Potential capacity
The National Renewable Energy Laboratory estimates that Washington has potential to install over 18,000 megawatts of onshore wind power.  Washington ranks 24th in its potential for onshore wind generation, and also has the potential to install 120,964 MW of offshore wind generation which could generate 488,025 GWh/year.

Installed
Installed wind power capacity in Washington has seen strong growth in recent years and Washington now ranks among the top ten states with the most wind power installed. Wind power accounted for 5.3% of total electricity generated in Washington during 2011.

The table below shows the growth in wind power installed nameplate capacity in MW for Washington from 1999 to 2011.

Statistics

Source:

See also

Solar power in Washington
Wind power in the United States
Renewable energy in the United States

References

External links